Malaoaneng is a community council located in the Leribe District of Lesotho. Its population in 2006 was 5,864.

Villages
The community of Malaoaneng includes the villages of Betha-Betha, Boiketlo (Ha Seetsa), Chache, Ha Abiele, Ha Abiele  (Papala), Ha Chachole, Ha Machobane, Ha Makhetloane, Ha Makuka, Ha Malefane, Ha Matsoso, Ha Mpoche, Ha Ntja, Ha Paka, Ha Ramokoinihi, Ha Ratulo, Ha Roelane, Ha Sepono, Hlokoa-Le-Monate, Kanana, Komeng, Letlapeng, Litaung, Matebeleng, Mohlomong (Ha Seetsa), Motse-Mocha (Ha Seetsa), Patuoe (Ha Makuka), Shebang, Tiping and Tutulung.

References

External links
 Google map of community villages

Populated places in Leribe District